Sean Cross is an American filmmaker, producer, actor, writer, and co-founder of the Los Cabos International Film Festival, Colorado Film Institute, and Vail Film Festival.

Background
Sean studied film at New York University.

Sean is the brother of Scott Cross, co-founder of the Los Cabos International Film Festival, Colorado Film Institute, and Vail Film Festival.

Career
Sean is a filmmaker and entrepreneur who has spent over a decade working in film. In 2004, Sean co-founded the Colorado Film Institute and the Vail Film Festival with his brother Scott Cross to serve as a platform to educate aspiring filmmakers, showcase unique artistic visions, and to ensure that powerful, creative independent films are seen by the movie-going public. In 2012 Sean co-founded the Los Cabos International Film Festival with his brother Scott Cross and leading businessmen from Mexico.

In 2006, Sean spearheaded the Vail Film Festival's partnership with Film Your Issue, a national issue film contest, in partnership with the American Democracy Project, featuring 30 to 60-second films. Thirty-five semi-finalists were named by the competition, and five winners were selected through a combination of a jury including Walter Cronkite, Brian Williams, then Senator Barack Obama, George Clooney, Philip Seymour Hoffman and others. The winning films from the Film Your Issue contest were screened at the Vail Film Festival.

In 2007 the Vail Film Festival became the only film festival to partner with Bono and Bobby Shriver's Product Red, an initiative to raise money for the Global Fund to fight AIDS, Tuberculosis and Malaria in Africa. Together, Product Red and the Vail Film Festival launched the worldwide film competition, the RED Vision Contest, whereby filmmakers submitted positive, inspiring films. The winning films were screened at the festival. The Vail Film Festival donated 25% of Avanti pass sales to the Global Fund.

Sean helped grow the Vail Film Festival into a major international film festival, recognized in 2007 as "One of the top ten destination film festivals in the world".

The Vail Film Festival has screened groundbreaking independent and studio films, including "Slow West", 'Cut Bank (film)", "Enemy (2013 film)", "Locke (film)", Before Sunset, Forgetting Sarah Marshall, Snow Cake, The Wendell Baker Story, House of D, the directorial debut of David Duchovny, and recognized some of the film industry's most talented actors and filmmakers, including legendary producer Edward R. Pressman (Wall Street, Reversal of Fortune, Hoffa, American Psycho, Bad Lieutenant, Thank You For Smoking, Fur), comedy icon Harold Ramis (Stripes, Caddyshack, Animal House, Ghostbusters, Groundhog Day), Luke Wilson (The Royal Tenenbaums), Kevin Smith (Clerks, Chasing Amy), Michelle Monaghan (Gone Baby Gone), Aaron Paul (Breaking Bad), Tim Daly (Wings), Jeremy Davies (Lost), Olivia Wilde (House, Tron: Legacy), Hayden Panettiere (Heroes), Jesse Eisenberg (Zombieland, Adventureland), Sophia Bush (One Tree Hill), Adrian Grenier (Entourage), Zach Braff (Scrubs, Garden State), Jane Seymour (Dr. Quinn, Medicine Woman), Josh Lucas (Sweet Home Alabama), Kate Bosworth (Win a Date with Tad Hamilton), Michael Imperioli (The Sopranos), Fred Schepisi (Roxanne, Six Degrees of Separation), Allison Janney (The West Wing, Juno), and Tate Taylor (The Help).

In 2012, Sean co-founded the Los Cabos International Film Festival (Originally named the Baja International Film Festival) with his brother Scott. The inaugural edition took place in Los Cabos from November 14–17, 2012 with Edward Norton as the official festival adviser. The 4th edition took place November 11–15, 2015. Festival guests have included Academy-Award winner Jared Leto, Liam Neeson, Ewan McGregor, Reese Witherspoon, Rosario Dawson, Atom Egoyan, Academy-Award nominee Edward Norton, Academy Award nominee Matt Dillon, Academy Award winner Melissa Leo, Academy Award winner Octavia Spencer, acclaimed Mexican actors Gael Garcia Bernal and Diego Luna, Academy Award nominee Virginia Madsen, 4-time Emmy nominee Allison Janney, Tate Taylor (writer/director of Academy Award nominated 'The Help'), director Michael Apted, Mike Judge, and many other high profile film industry professionals from the U.S., Mexico, and beyond.

References

External links
 Sean Cross Product Red interview
 WireImage photo of Sean-Cross, Edward-Norton, Allison-Janney, Octavia-Spencer at Vail Film Festival
 WireImage photo of Sean-Cross, Tate-Taylor, Allison-Janney, Octavia-Spencer at Vail Film Festival
 WireImage photo of Sean-Cross, Allison-Janney, Octavia-Spencer at Vail Film Festival
 WireImage photo of Sean-Cross, Scott-Cross at Vail Film Festival
 WireImage photo of Edward-Norton, Allison-Janney, Sean-Cross, Octavia-Spencer at Vail Film Festival
 WireImage photo of Sean-Cross, Scott-Cross at Vail Film Festival
 WireImage photo of Allison-Janney, Sean-Cross, Octavia-Spencer at Vail Film Festival
 2009 Vail Film Festival Press Release, Sean Cross quote
 Sean Cross interview on PlumTV
 Vail Film Festival Facebook Fan page
 Cabo International Film Festival Facebook Fan page
 Men's Health interview with Sean Cross and Scott Cross

American male actors
American film producers
Year of birth missing (living people)
Film festival founders
Living people